Dennis Lynn Rader (born March 9, 1945) is an American serial killer known as BTK (an abbreviation he gave himself, for "bind, torture, kill"), the BTK Strangler or the BTK Killer. Between 1974 and 1991, he killed ten people in Wichita and Park City, Kansas, and sent taunting letters to police and media outlets describing the details of his crimes. After a decade-long hiatus, Rader resumed sending letters in 2004, leading to his 2005 arrest and subsequent guilty plea. He is currently serving 10 consecutive life sentences at the El Dorado Correctional Facility.

Life and background
Rader was born on March 9, 1945, to Dorothea Mae Rader and William Elvin Rader, one of four sons. Sources give Rader's place of birth as either Columbus, Kansas, or Pittsburg, Kansas. He grew up in Wichita. Both parents worked long hours and paid little attention to their children at home; Rader later described feeling ignored by his mother in particular and resenting her for it.

From a young age, Rader harbored sadistic sexual fantasies about torturing "trapped and helpless" women. He also exhibited zoosadism by torturing, killing, and hanging small animals. Rader acted out sexual fetishes for voyeurism, autoerotic asphyxiation, and cross-dressing; he often spied on female neighbors while dressed in women's clothing, including women's underwear that he had stolen, and masturbated with ropes or other bindings around his arms and neck.

Years later, during his "cooling off" periods between murders, Rader would take pictures of himself wearing women's clothes and a female mask while bound. He later admitted that he was pretending to be his victims as part of a sexual fantasy. However, Rader kept his sexual proclivities well-hidden, and he was widely regarded in his community as "normal, polite, and well mannered".

After graduating from Wichita Heights High School, Rader attended Kansas Wesleyan University, but received mediocre grades and dropped out after one year. He served in the United States Air Force from 1966 to 1970. On discharge, he moved to Park City (a suburb of Wichita), where he worked in the meat department of an IGA supermarket where his mother was a bookkeeper. Rader married Paula Dietz on May 22, 1971; they had two children, Kerri and Brian. He attended Butler County Community College in El Dorado, earning an associate degree in electronics in 1973. He then enrolled at Wichita State University, and graduated in 1979 with a Bachelor of Science degree, majoring in Administration of Justice.

Rader initially worked as an assembler for the Coleman Company, an outdoor supply company. He then worked at the Wichita-based office of ADT Security Services from 1974 to 1988, where he installed security alarms as part of his job, in many cases for homeowners concerned about the BTK killings. Rader was a census field operations supervisor for the Wichita area in 1989, before the 1990 federal census.

In May 1991, Rader became a dogcatcher and compliance officer in Park City. In this position, neighbors recalled him as being sometimes overzealous and extremely strict, as well as taking special pleasure in bullying and harassing single women. One neighbor complained that Rader killed her dog for no reason.

Rader was a member of Christ Lutheran Church in Wichita and had been elected president of the church council. He was also a Cub Scout leader.

On July 26, 2005, after Rader's arrest, his wife was granted an "emergency divorce" (waiving the normal waiting period).

In an interview with ABC News in 2019, Rader's daughter Kerri said she still writes to her father and has now forgiven him, but still struggles to reconcile him with the BTK killer, stating her childhood seemed normal and they were a "normal American family".

Case history

Murders 
On January 15, 1974, four members of the Otero family were murdered in Wichita, Kansas. The victims were Joseph Otero, age 38; Julie Otero, age 33; Joseph Otero Jr., age 9; and Josephine Otero, age 11. Their bodies were discovered by the family's three older children, Charlie, Danny, and Carmen, who had been at school at the time of the killings. After his 2005 arrest, Rader confessed to killing the Otero family. Rader wrote a letter that had been stashed inside an engineering book in the Wichita Public Library in October 1974, which described in detail the killing of the Otero family in January of that year.

Between the spring of 1974 and winter 1977, Rader killed three more women: Kathryn Bright (April 4, 1974), Shirley Vian Relford (March 17, 1977), and Nancy Fox (December 8, 1977). In early 1978, he sent another letter to television station KAKE in Wichita, claiming responsibility for the murders of the Oteros, Bright, Vian Relford, and Fox. He suggested many possible names for himself, including the one that stuck: BTK. He demanded media attention in this second letter, and it was finally announced that Wichita did indeed have a serial killer at large. A poem was enclosed titled "Oh! Death to Nancy," a parody of the lyrics to the American folk song "O Death". In the letter, he claimed to be driven to kill by "factor X", which he characterized as a supernatural element that also motivated Jack the Ripper, the Son of Sam, and the Hillside Strangler murders.

He also intended to kill others, such as Anna Williams, who in 1979, aged 63, escaped death by returning home much later than expected. Rader explained during his confession that he became obsessed with Williams and was "absolutely livid" when she evaded him. He spent hours waiting at her home but became impatient and left when she did not return home from visiting friends.

Marine Hedge, aged 53, was found on May 5, 1985, at East 53rd Street North between North Webb Road and North Greenwich Road in Wichita. Rader killed her on April 27, and took her dead body to his church, Christ Lutheran Church, where he was the president of the church council. There, he photographed her body in various bondage positions. Rader had previously stored black plastic sheets and other materials at the church in preparation for the murder and then later dumped the body in a remote ditch. He had called his plan "Project Cookie".

In 1988, after the murders of three members of the Fager family in Wichita, a letter was received from someone claiming to be the BTK killer, in which the author of the letter denied being the perpetrator of the Fager murders. The author credited the killer with having done "admirable work." It was not proven until 2005 that this letter was, in fact, written by Rader. He is not considered by police to have committed this crime. 

Two women Rader stalked in the 1980s and one whom he stalked in the mid-1990s filed restraining orders against him. One of them also changed her address to avoid him.

His final victim, Dolores E. Davis, was found on February 1, 1991, at West 117th Street North and North Meridian Street in Park City. Rader had killed her on January 19.

Cold case 
By 2004, the investigation of the BTK Killer was considered a cold case. Then, Rader initiated a series of 11 communications to the local media. This activity led directly to his arrest in February 2005.

In March 2004, The Wichita Eagle received a letter from someone using the name Bill Thomas Killman. The author of the letter claimed that he had murdered Vicki Wegerle on September 16, 1986, and enclosed photographs of the crime scene and a photocopy of her driver's license, which had been stolen at the time of the crime. Before this, it had not been definitively established that Wegerle was killed by BTK. DNA collected from under Wegerle's fingernails provided police with previously unknown evidence. They then began DNA testing hundreds of men in an effort to find the serial killer. Altogether, more than 1,300 DNA samples were taken and later destroyed by court order.

In May 2004, television station KAKE in Wichita received a letter with chapter headings for the "BTK Story", fake IDs, and a word puzzle. On June 9, a package was found taped to a stop sign at the corner of First and Kansas roads in Wichita. It had graphic descriptions of the Otero murders and a sketch labeled "The Sexual Thrill Is My Bill." Also enclosed was a chapter list for a proposed book titled The BTK Story, which mimicked a story written in 1999 by Court TV crime writer David Lohr. Chapter One was titled "A Serial Killer Is Born." In July, a package dropped into the return slot at a public library contained more bizarre material, including the claim that he was responsible for the death of 19-year-old Jake Allen in Argonia, Kansas, earlier that month. This claim was false, and the death was ruled a suicide.

After his capture, Rader admitted in his interrogation that he had been planning to kill again and he had set a date, October 2004, and was stalking his intended victim. In October 2004, a manila envelope was dropped into a UPS box in Wichita. It had many cards with images of terror and bondage of children pasted on them, a poem threatening the life of lead investigator Lt. Ken Landwehr, and a false autobiography with many details about Rader's life. These details were later released to the public. In December 2004, Wichita police received another package from the BTK killer. This time, the package was found in Wichita's Murdock Park. It had the driver's license of Nancy Fox, which was noted as stolen from the crime scene, as well as a doll that was symbolically bound at the hands and feet, and had a plastic bag tied over its head.

In January 2005, Rader attempted to leave a cereal box in the bed of a pickup truck at a Home Depot in Wichita, but the box was discarded by the truck's owner. It was later retrieved from the trash after Rader asked what had become of it in a later message. Surveillance tape of the parking lot from that date revealed a distant figure driving a black Jeep Cherokee leaving the box in the pickup. In February 2005, more postcards were sent to KAKE, and another cereal box left at a rural location was found to contain another bound doll.

In his letters to police, Rader asked if his writings, if put on a floppy disk, could be traced or not. The police answered his question in a newspaper ad posted in The Wichita Eagle, saying it would be safe to use the disk. On February 16, 2005, Rader sent a purple 1.44-Megabyte Memorex floppy disk to Fox affiliate KSAS-TV in Wichita. Also enclosed were a letter, a gold-colored necklace with a large medallion, and a photocopy of the cover of Rules of Prey, a 1989 novel by John Sandford about a serial killer.

Police found metadata embedded in a deleted Microsoft Word document that was, unknown to Rader, still stored on the floppy disk. The metadata contained the words "Christ Lutheran Church", and the document was marked as last modified by "Dennis". An Internet search determined that a "Dennis Rader" was president of the church council. When investigators drove by Rader's house, a black Jeep Cherokee—the type of vehicle seen in the Home Depot surveillance footage—was parked outside.
This was strong circumstantial evidence against Rader, but they needed more direct evidence to detain him.

Police obtained a warrant to test a pap smear taken from Rader's daughter at the Kansas State University medical clinic. DNA tests showed a "familial match" between the pap smear and the sample from Wegerle's fingernails; this indicated that the killer was closely related to Rader's daughter, and combined with the other evidence was enough for police to arrest Rader.

Arrest 
Rader was arrested while driving near his home in Park City shortly after noon on February 25, 2005. An officer asked, "Mr. Rader, do you know why you're going downtown?" Rader replied, "Oh, I have suspicions why." Wichita Police, the Kansas Bureau of Investigation, the FBI, and ATF agents searched Rader's home and vehicle, seizing evidence including computer equipment, a pair of black pantyhose retrieved from a shed, and a cylindrical container. The church he attended, his office at City Hall, and the main branch of the Park City library were also searched. At a press conference the next morning, Wichita Police Chief Norman Williams announced, "the bottom line: BTK is arrested."

Legal proceedings 
On February 28, 2005, Rader was charged with 10 counts of first degree murder. Soon after his arrest, the Associated Press cited an anonymous source alleging that Rader had confessed to other murders in addition to those with which he had been connected. However, the Sedgwick County district attorney denied the story, yet refused to say whether Rader had made any confessions, or if investigators were looking into Rader's possible involvement in more unsolved killings. On March 5, news sources claimed to have verified by multiple sources that Rader had confessed to the 10 murders he was charged with, but no other ones.

On March 1, Rader's bail was set at US$10 million, and a public defender was appointed to represent him. On May 3, the judge entered not guilty pleas on Rader's behalf, as Rader did not speak at his arraignment; however, on June 27, the scheduled trial date, Rader changed his plea to guilty. He described the murders in detail and made no apologies.

At Rader's August 18 sentencing, victims' families made statements, after which Rader apologized in a rambling 30-minute monologue that the prosecutor likened to an Academy Awards acceptance speech. His statement has been described as an example of an often-observed phenomenon among psychopaths: their inability to understand the emotional content of language. He was sentenced to 10 consecutive life sentences, with a minimum of 175 years. Kansas had no death penalty at the time of the murders. On August 19, he was moved to the El Dorado Correctional Facility.

Rader talked about innocuous topics such as the weather during the 40-minute drive to El Dorado, but began to cry when the victims' families' statements from the court proceedings came on the radio. He is now in solitary confinement for his protection (with one hour of exercise per day, and showers three times per week). This will likely continue indefinitely. Beginning in 2006, he was allowed access to television and radio, to read magazines, and other privileges for good behavior.

Further investigations 
Following Rader's arrest, police in Wichita, Park City and several surrounding cities looked into unsolved cases with the cooperation of the state police and the FBI. They particularly focused on cases after 1994, when the death penalty was reinstated in Kansas. Police in surrounding states such as Nebraska, Missouri, Colorado, Oklahoma and Texas also investigated cold cases that fit Rader's pattern to some extent. The FBI and local jurisdictions at Rader's former duty stations checked into unsolved cases during Rader's time in the service.

After exhaustive investigations, none of these agencies discovered any further murders attributable to Rader, confirming early suspicions that Rader would have taken credit for any additional murders that he had committed. The ten known murders are now believed to be the only murders for which Rader is actually responsible, although Wichita police are fairly certain that Rader stalked and researched a number of other potential victims. This includes one person who was saved when Rader called off his planned attack upon his arrival near the target's home due to the presence of construction and road crews nearby. Rader stated in his police interview that "there are a lot of lucky people", meaning that he had thought about and developed various levels of murder plans for other victims.

Evaluation by Robert Mendoza 
Massachusetts psychologist Robert Mendoza was hired by Rader's court-appointed public defenders to conduct a psychological evaluation of Rader, and determine if an insanity-based defense might be viable. He conducted an interview after Rader had pleaded guilty on June 27, 2005. Mendoza diagnosed Rader with narcissistic, antisocial, and obsessive–compulsive personality disorders: He observed that Rader has a grandiose sense of self, a belief that he is "special" and therefore entitled to special treatment; a pathological need for attention and admiration; a preoccupation with maintaining rigid order and structure; and a complete lack of empathy.

The videotape of Mendoza's interview ended up being used on NBC's Dateline. NBC claimed Rader knew the interview might be televised, but this was false according to the Sedgwick County Sheriff's Office. Rader mentioned the interview during his sentencing statement. On October 25, 2005, the Kansas attorney general filed a petition to sue Mendoza and Tali Waters, co-owners of Cambridge Forensic Consultants, LLC, for breach of contract, claiming that they intended to benefit financially from the use of information obtained through involvement in Rader's defense. On May 10, 2007, Mendoza settled the case for US$30,000 with no admission of wrongdoing.

Victims

In media 
Forensic psychologist Katherine Ramsland compiled Confession of a Serial Killer from her five-year correspondence with Rader.
 
Multiple works draw on the case:
 Stephen King has said his novella A Good Marriage, and the film based on it, were inspired by the BTK killer. 
 Novelist Thomas Harris has said that the character of Francis Dolarhyde in his 1981 novel Red Dragon is partially based on the then-unidentified BTK Killer.
Episode 4 of season 6 (2004) of Law & Order: Special Victims Unit is based on this case.
 Episode 15 of season 1 (2006) of Criminal Minds is based on Rader's murders.
 Rader's case is portrayed in Episode 1 of season 2 (2022) on the Netflix series Catching Killers.
 A character based on Rader played by actor Sonny Valicenti appears in the Netflix series Mindhunter.
 Kane Hodder portrays Rader in the 2008 movie B.T.K., a half biopic and half fictionalized account of the murders.
 The antagonist from the movie The Clovehitch Killer was inspired by Dennis Rader.
 Thrash metal band Exodus wrote a song entitled "BTK", which was inspired by Dennis Rader's crime history.
 The song "Raider II" from Steven Wilson's 2011 album Grace for Drowning is written primarily about Rader's murders.

See also 
 I Survived BTK
 List of serial killers in the United States
 List of serial killers by number of victims

References

Further reading 
 Beattie, Robert. Nightmare in Wichita: The Hunt for the BTK Strangler. New American Library, 2005. .
 Davis, Jeffrey M. The Shadow of Evil: Where Is God in a Violent World?. Kendall/Hunt Publishing Company, 1996. . (Davis is the son of BTK victim Dolores Davis.)
 Douglas, John E. Inside the Mind of BTK: The True Story Behind Thirty Years of Hunting for the Wichita Serial Killer. Jossey Bass Wiley, 2007. .
 Ramsland, Katherine. Confession of a Serial Killer: The Untold Story of Dennis Rader, the BTK Killer. Foredge, 2016. .
 Rawson, Kerri. A Serial Killer's Daughter: My Story of Faith, Love, and Overcoming. Thomas Nelson, 2019. .
 Singular, Stephen. Unholy Messenger: The Life and Crimes of the BTK Serial Killer. Scribner Book Company, 2006. .
 Smith, Carlton. The BTK Murders: Inside the "Bind Torture Kill" Case that Terrified America's Heartland. St. Martin's True Crime, 2006. .
 Wenzl, Roy; Potter, Tim; Laviana, Hurst; Kelly, L. Bind, Torture, Kill: The Inside Story of the Serial Killer Next Door. HC an imprint of HarperCollins, 2007. .
 Welch, Larry. Beyond Cold Blood: The KBI from Ma Barker to BTK. University Press of Kansas, 2012. .

External links 

 B.T.K. – The Worlds Most Elusive Serial Killer
 Sedgwick County 18th Judicial District collection of legal documents on the Rader case
 The Wichita Eagle Collection of articles and videos about BTK
 KAKE Collection of articles and videos on BTK
 Dennis Rader's listing on the Kansas Department of Corrections Kansas Adult Supervised Population Electronic Repository site, including current location and disciplinary actions.
 "Finding BTK" Investigation Discovery
 When your father is the BTK serial killer, forgiveness is not tidy

1945 births
20th-century American criminals
American Lutherans
American male criminals
American mass murderers
American murderers of children
American people convicted of murder
American people of Danish descent
American people of German descent
American people of Swiss descent
American prisoners sentenced to life imprisonment
American serial killers
Butler Community College alumni
Crime in Kansas
Criminals from Kansas
Living people
Male serial killers
Military personnel from Kansas
People convicted of murder by Kansas
People from Pittsburg, Kansas
People from Sedgwick County, Kansas
People with antisocial personality disorder
People with narcissistic personality disorder
People with obsessive-compulsive personality disorder
Prisoners sentenced to life imprisonment by Kansas
Serial killers who worked in law enforcement
Torture in the United States
United States Air Force non-commissioned officers
Violence against women in the United States
Wichita State University alumni